The Japan national under-23 futsal team represents Japan in international under-23 futsal competitions. It is controlled by the Futsal Commission of the Japan Football Association.

2023 

Fixtures & Results (U-23 futsal 2023), JFA.jp

Coaching staff

Current coaching staff

Players

Current squad
The following players were called-up for an overseas training camp, held in France from 28 January to 3 February 2023.

See also
 Sport in Japan
 Futsal in Japan
 Japan Football Association (JFA)
 National teams
 Men's
 Japan national futsal team
 Japan national under-20 futsal team
 Women's
 Japan women's national futsal team

References

External links
  Japan national under-23 futsal team – official website

N
Futsal